Robert Clavel (1912–1991) was a French art director.

Selected filmography
 All Roads Lead to Rome (1949)
 Tuesday's Guest (1950)
 Old Boys of Saint-Loup (1950)
 The Paris Waltz (1950)
 Passion (1951)
 She and Me (1952)
 Virgile (1953)
 The Count of Monte Cristo (1954)
 Yours Truly, Blake (1954)
 Charming Boys (1957)
 Nathalie, Secret Agent (1959)
 Belle de Jour (1967)
 Under the Sign of the Bull (1969)

References

Bibliography
 Hayward, Susan. French Costume Drama of the 1950s: Fashioning Politics in Film. Intellect Books, 2010.

External links

1912 births
1991 deaths
French art directors
Film people from Paris